Joan Lockton (1903–?) was a British actress.

Selected filmography
 The Disappearance of the Judge (1919)
 Pillars of Society (1920)
 Miss Charity (1921)
 White Slippers (1924)
 The Sins Ye Do (1924)
 Confessions (1925)
 A Woman Redeemed (1927)
 The King's Highway (1927)

References

External links
 

1903 births
Year of death missing
British film actresses
Actresses from London
20th-century British actresses
20th-century English women
20th-century English people